The French National Museum of Natural History, known in French as the  (abbreviation MNHN), is the national natural history museum of France and a  of higher education part of Sorbonne Universities. The main museum, with four galleries,  is located in Paris, France, within the Jardin des Plantes on the left bank of the River Seine. It was formally founded in 1793 during the French Revolution, but was begun even earlier in 1635 as the royal garden of medicinal plants. The museum now has 14 sites throughout France.

History

17th–18th century 

The museum was formally established on June 10, 1793, by the French Convention, the government during the French Revolution, at the same time that it established the Louvre Museum.  But its origins went back much further, to the Royal Garden of Medicinal Plants, which was  created by King Louis XIII in 1635, and was directed and run by the royal physicians. A royal proclamation of the boy-king Louis XV on 31 March 1718, removed the purely medical function. Besides growing and studying plants useful for health, the royal garden offered public lectures on botany, chemistry, and comparative anatomy. In 1729 the chateau in the garden was enlarged with an upper floor, and transformed into the cabinet of natural history, designed for the royal collections of zoology and mineralogy. A series of greenhouses were constructed on the west side of the garden, to study the plants and animals collected by French explorers for their for medical and commercial uses.

From 1739 until 1788, the garden was under the direction of Georges-Louis Leclerc, Comte de Buffon, one of the leading naturalists of the Enlightenment. Though he did not go on scientific expeditions himself, he wrote a monumental and influential work, "Natural History", in thirty-six volumes, published between 1749 and 1788. In his books, he challenged the traditional religious ideas that nature had not changed since the creation; he suggested that the earth was seventy-five thousand years old, divided into seven periods, with man arriving in the most recent. He also helped fund much research, through the iron foundry which he owned and directed.  His statue is prominently placed in front of the Gallery of Evolution.

Following the French Revolution the museum was reorganized, with twelve professorships of equal rank. Some of its early professors included eminent comparative anatomist Georges Cuvier and the pioneers of the theory of evolution.  Jean-Baptiste de Lamarck and Étienne Geoffroy Saint-Hilaire. The museum's aims were to instruct the public, put together collections and conduct scientific research. The naturalist Louis Jean Marie Daubenton wrote extensively about biology for the pioneer French Encyclopédie, and gave his name to several newly discovered species. The museum sent its trained botanists on scientific expeditions around the world. Major figures in the museum included Déodat de Dolomieu, who gave his name to the mineral dolomite and to a volcano on Reunion island, and the botanist  Rene Desfontaines, who  spent two years collecting plants for study Tunisia and Algeria, and whose book "Flora Atlantica"  (1798–1799, 2 vols), added  three hundred genera new to science.

When Napoleon Bonaparte launched his military campaign to conquer Egypt in 1798, his army was accompanied by more than 154 scientists, including botanists, chemists, mineralogists, including Étienne Geoffroy Saint-Hilaire, Vivant Denon, Joseph Fourier, and Claude Louis Berthollet, who together took back a large quantity of specimens and illustrations to enrich the collections of the museum.

19th century 

The museum continued to flourish during the 19th century,  particularly under the direction of chemist Michel Eugène Chevreul, His research with animal fats  revolutionized the manufacture of soap and of candles and led to his isolation of the heptadecanoic (margaric), stearic, and oleic fatty acids. In the medical field, he was first to demonstrate that diabetics excrete glucose. and to isolate creatine.  His theories of color "provided the scientific basis for Impressionist and Neo-Impressionist painting."

By wrapping uranium salts in photographic paper, he first demonstrated the radioactive properties of uranium. In 1903, he shared the  Nobel Prize in Physics with Pierre Curie and Marie Curie for the discovery of spontaneous radioactivity. Four generations of Becquerels held this chairmanship, from 1838 to 1948.

As its collections grew, the museum was enlarged, with the construction of a new gallery of zoology. it was  begun in 1877 and completed in 1889, for the 100th anniversary of the French Revolution. A new gallery of paleontology and comparative anatomy was opened in 1897. The cost of construction Drained the museum budget and it began to run short of funds. Its emphasis on teaching brought it into conflict with the University of Paris, which had better political connections. It gradually scaled back its program of teaching and focused primarily on research and the museum collections.

20th–21st century 
After receiving greater financial autonomy in 1907, it began a new phase of growth. In 1934, the museum opened the Paris Zoological Park, a new zoo to in the Bois de Vincennes, as the home for the larger animals of the Menagerie of the Jardin des Plantes. In 1937 it opens the Musée de l'Homme, a museum of anthropology located in Palais de Chaillot, across the Seine from the Eiffel Tower, in a building created for the 1937 Paris International Exposition. In recent decades, it has directed its research and education efforts at the effects on the environment of human exploitation.

Some of the buildings, particularly the Grand Gallery of Evolution, completed in 1889, were in poor condition by the mid-20th century. It was closed entirely in 1965, then underwent major restoration between 1991 and 1994 to its present state.

Plan

Galleries and gardens 
The birthplace of the museum and a large part of its modern collections are found in five galleries  in the Jardin des Plantes. These are the Gallery of Evolution; the Gallery of Mineralogy and Geology; the Gallery of Botany; the Gallery of Paleontology and Comparative Anatomy and the Laboratory of Entomology.

The Grand Gallery of Evolution 

The National Museum of Natural History has been called "the Louvre of the Natural Sciences." It replaced an earlier Neoclassical gallery built next to the same by Buffon, opened in 1785, and demolished in 1935. It was proposed in 1872 and begun in 1877 by the architect Louis-Jules André, a teacher at the influential École des Beaux-Arts in Paris. It is a prominent example of Beaux Arts Architecture. It was opened in 1889 for the Paris Universal Exposition of 1889, which also presented the Eiffel Tower. It was never fully completed in its original design; it never received the neoclassical entrance planned for the side of the building away from the garden,  facing Rue Geoffroy-Saint-Hilaire.

The facade of the building  was designed specifically as a backdrop for the garden. The facade facing the garden is divided into eleven traverses. Ten   are decorated with sculpted medallions honouring prominent French scientists associated with the museum. The central traverse has a larger marble statue of a woman seated holding a book, in a pose similar to that of statue of Buffon facing the building.  The statues are the work of Eugene Guillaume, a pupil of the sculptor Pradier.

While the building exterior was neo-classical, the iron framework of the interior was extremely modern for the 19th century, like that of the Gare d'Orsay railroad station of the same period. It contained an immense rectangular hall, 55 meters long, 25 wide and 15 meters high, supported by forty slender cast-iron columns, and was originally covered with a glass roof one thousand square meters in size.The building suffered from technical problems, and was closed entirely in 1965. It was extensively remodelled between 1991–94 and reopened in its present form.

The great central hall, kept in its same form but enlarged during the modernisation,  is devoted to the presentation of marine animals on the lower sides, and, on a platform in the center, a parade of full-size African mammals, including a rhinoceros originally presented to King Louis XV in the 18th century. On the garden side is another hall, in its original size, devoted to animals which have disappeared or are in danger of extinction.

Gallery of Mineralogy and Geology 

The Gallery of Mineralogy, looking across the formal garden and close to the Gallery of Evolution,  was constructed between 1833 and 1837 by Charles Rohault de Fleury in a neoclassical style, with two porticos of Doric columns. Directly in front is the rose garden, renewed in 1990 with 170 types of European roses, as well as a Styphnolobium japonicum or Japanese pagoda tree, planted there by Bernard de Jussieu in 1747.

The gallery contains over 600,000 stones and fossils. It is particularly known for its collection of giant crystals, including colourful examples of azurite, Tourmaline (Rubelite), Malachite and Ammonite. Other displays include the jars and vestiges of the original royal apothecary of Louis XIV, and three Florentine marble marquetry tables from the palace of Cardinal Mazarin.

The gallery also contains a large collection of meteorites, gathered from around the world. These include a large fragment of Canyon Diablo meteorite, a piece of an asteroid which fell in Arizona about 550,000 years ago, and created the Meteor crater. It weighs 360 kilograms (970 pounds).

Gallery of Botany 

The Gallery of Botany is on the Allée the Buffon facing the centre of the garden, between the Gallery of Mineralogy and the Gallery of Paleontology. At the corner is one of the two oldest trees in Paris, a Robinia pseudoacacia or black locust, planted in 1635 by Vespasien Robin, the royal gardener and botanist, from an earlier tree brought from America by his brother, also a botanist, in 1601. It is tied in age with another from the same source planted at the same time on the square of Saint-Julien-le-Pauvre.

The Gallery was built in 1930–35 with a grant from the Rockefeller Foundation. Directly in front is a statue entitled "Science and Mystery" by J.L.D. Schroeder, made in 1889. It represents the enigma of and old man meditating over an egg and a chicken, pondering which came first.

The primary content of the gallery is the Herbier National, a collection representing 7.5 million plants collected since the founding of the muuseum. They are divided for study into Spermatophytes, plants which reproduce with seeds, and cryptogams, plants which reproduce with spores, such as algae, lichens and mushrooms.  Many of the plants were collected by Jean Baptiste Christophore Fusée Aublet, the royal pharmacist and botanist in French Guiana. In 1775 he published his "Histoire des plantes de la Guiane Française"  describing 576 genera and 1,241 species of neotropical plants, including more than 400 species that were new to science, at a time when only 20,000 plants had been described,

The ground floor interior of the gallery has vestibules built in a combination of Art Deco and Neo-Egyptian styles. It is used for temporary exhibits. The exhibits include a slice of a giant Sequoia tree, 2200 years old, which fell naturally in 1917.

The Gallery of Paleontology and Comparative Anatomy 

The Gallery of Paleontology and Comparative Anatomy was built between 1894 and 1897 by architect Ferdinand Dutert, who had built the innovative iron-framed Galerie des machines at the 1889 Paris Exposition.  A new pavilion in the same style was added to the west side of the gallery; it was completed in 1961. In front of the Gallery is the Iris Garden, created in 1964, which displays 260 varieties of iris flowers, and a sculpture, "Nymph with a pitcher" (1837) by Isidore Hippolyte Brion.  The sides of gallery are also decorated with sculpture; twelve relief sculptures of animals in bronze and fourteen medallions of famous biologists. The ironwork grill and stone arches over the entrance are  filled with elaborate designs and sculpture of seashells.  Inside the entrance is a large marble statue of an Orangutan strangling a hunter, created in 1885 by the noted animal sculptor Emmanuel Fremiet, best known for his statue of Joan of Arc on horseback on the Place des Pyramides in Paris.

Jardin des Plantes 

The Jardin des plantes is the home of the main galleries of the National Museum of Natural History, and a division of the museum, which was born there. The garden was founded by Louis XIII 1635 as the Royal Garden of medicinal plants, under the direction of the royal physician. In the early 18th century, the chateau of the gardens was enlarged to house the collections of the royal pharmacist. In 1729, this collection was broadened into the Cabinet of Natural History, destined to receive the Royal collections dedicated to zoology and mineralogy. New plants and animal species were collected from around the world, examined, illustrated, classified, named and described in publications which were circulated across Europe and to America. An amphitheater was constructed in the garden in 1787 to provide a venue for lectures and classes on the new discoveries. New greenhouses were built beginning in 1788, and the size of the gardens was doubled. The gardens served as the laboratory of scientists including Jean Baptiste Lamarck, author of the earliest theory of evolution, and were a base for major scientific expeditions by Nicolas Baudin, Alexander von Humboldt, Jules Dumont d'Urville and others throughout the 18th and 19th century.

The gardens today include a large formal garden planted in geometric designs; and two enormous greenhouses, keeping tropical plants at a steady temperature of 22 degrees Celsius. The Alpine gardens present plants coming from Corsica, the Caucasus, North American and the Himalaya. The gardens of the School of Botany contain 3,800 species of plants, displayed by genre and family.

Ménagerie of the Jardin des Plantes 

The Menagerie is the second-oldest public zoo in the world still in operation, following the Tiergarten Schönbrunn in Vienna, Austria, founded in 1752. It occupies the northeast side of the garden along the Quai St. Bernard, covering five hectares (13.6 acres). It was created between 1798 and 1836 as a home for the animals of the royal menagerie at Versailles, which were largely abandoned after the French Revolution. Its architecture features picturesque "fabriques", or pavilions, mostly created in the 19th century, to shelter the animals. In the 20th century the larger animals were moved to the Paris Zoological Park, a more extensive site in the Bois de Vincennes. also governed by the National Museum of Natural History. The menagerie is currently home to about six hundred mammals, birds, reptiles, amphibians and invertebrates, representing about 189 species. These include the Amur leopard from China, one of the rarest cats on earth.

Mission and organization
The museum has as its mission both research (fundamental and applied) and public diffusion of knowledge. It is organized into seven research and three diffusion departments.

The research departments are:
 Classification and Evolution
 Regulation, Development, and Molecular Diversity
 Aquatic Environments and Populations
 Ecology and Biodiversity Management
 History of Earth
 Men, Nature, and Societies, and
 Prehistory

The diffusion departments are:
 The Galleries of the 
 Botanical Parks and Zoos, and
 The Museum of Man

The museum also developed higher education, and now delivers a master's degree.

Location and branches

The museum comprises fourteen sites throughout France with four in Paris, including the Jardin des Plantes in the 5th arrondissement. (métro Place Monge).

The herbarium of the museum, referred to by code P, includes a large number of important collections amongst its 8 000 000 plant specimens. The historical collections incorporated into the herbarium, each with its P prefix, include those of Jean-Baptiste de Lamarck (P-LA) René Louiche Desfontaines (P-Desf.), Joseph Pitton de Tournefort and Charles Plumier (P-TRF). The designation at CITES is FR 75A. It publishes the botanical periodical Adansonia and journals on the flora of New Caledonia, Madagascar and Comoro Islands, Cambodia, Laos and Vietnam, Cameroon, and Gabon.

The  is also in Paris, in the 16th arrondissement (métro Trocadéro).  It houses displays in ethnography and physical anthropology, including artifacts, fossils, and other objects.

Also part of the museum are:

Chairs

Over the ensuing years the number of Chairs and their subject areas evolved, some being subdivided into two positions and others removed. The list of Chairs of the Muséum national d'histoire naturelle includes major figures in the history of the Natural sciences. Early chaired positions were held by Jean-Baptiste Lamarck, René Desfontaines and Georges Cuvier, and later occupied by Paul Rivet, Léon Vaillant and others.

In popular culture
The Gallery of Palaeontology and Comparative Anatomy and other parts of Jardin des Plantes was a source of inspiration for French graphic novelist Jacques Tardi. The story opens with a 136-million-year-old pterodactyl egg hatching, and a live pterodactyl escaping through the gallery glass roof, wreaking havoc and killing people in Paris. (The Gallery of Palaeontology and Comparative Anatomy returned the favor by placing a life size cardboard cutout of Adèle and the hatching pterodactyl in a glass cabinet outside the main entrance on the top floor balcony.)

Directors of the museum

Directors elected for one year:

 1793 to 1794 : Louis Jean-Marie Daubenton
 1794 to 1795 : Antoine-Laurent de Jussieu
 1795 to 1796 : Bernard Germain Étienne de Laville-sur-Illon, comte de Lacépède
 1796 to 1797 : Louis Jean-Marie Daubenton
 1797 to 1798 : Louis Jean-Marie Daubenton
 1798 to 1799 : Antoine-Laurent de Jussieu
 1799 to 1800 : Antoine-Laurent de Jussieu

Directors elected for two years:

 1800 to 1801 : Antoine-François Fourcroy
 1802 to 1803 : René Desfontaines
 1804 to 1805 : Antoine-François Fourcroy
 1806 to 1807 : René Desfontaines
 1808 to 1809 : Georges Cuvier
 1810 to 1811 : René Desfontaines
 1812 to 1813 : André Laugier
 1814 to 1815 : André Thouin
 1816 to 1817 : André Thouin
 1818 to 1819 : André Laugier
 1820 to 1821 : René Desfontaines
 1822 to 1823 : Georges Cuvier
 1824 to 1825 : Louis Cordier
 1826 to 1827 : Georges Cuvier
 1828 to 1829 : René Desfontaines
 1830 to 1831 : Georges Cuvier
 1832 to 1833 : Louis Cordier
 1834 to 1835 : Adrien de Jussieu
 1836 to 1837 : Michel Eugène Chevreul
 1838 to 1839 : Louis Cordier
 1840 to 1841 : Michel Eugène Chevreul
 1842 to 1843 : Adrien de Jussieu
 1844 to 1845 : Michel Eugène Chevreul
 1846 to 1847 : Adolphe Brongniart
 1848 to 1849 : Adrien de Jussieu
 1850 to 1851 : Michel Eugène Chevreul
 1852 to 1853 : André Marie Constant Duméril
 1854 to 1855 : Michel Eugène Chevreul
 1856 to 1857 : Marie Jean Pierre Flourens
 1858 to 1859 : Michel Eugène Chevreul
 1860 to 1861 : Isidore Geoffroy Saint-Hilaire
 1862 to 1863 : Michel Eugène Chevreul

Directors elected for five years:

 1863 to 1879 : Michel Eugène Chevreul
 1879 to 1891 : Edmond Frémy
 1891 to 1900 : Alphonse Milne-Edwards
 1900 to 1919 : Edmond Perrier
 1919 to 1931 : Louis Mangin
 1932 to 1936 : Paul Lemoine
 1936 to 1942 : Louis Germain
 1942 to 1949 : Achille Urbain
 1950 to 1950 : René Jeannel
 1951 to 1965 : Roger Heim
 1966 to 1970 : Maurice Fontaine
 1971 to 1975 : Yves Le Grand
 1976 to 1985 : Jean Dorst
 1985 to 1990 : Philippe Taquet
 1994 to 1999 : Henry de Lumley

Presidents elected for five years:

 2002 to 2006 : Bernard Chevassus-au-Louis
 2006 to 2008 : André Menez (deceased in February 2008)
 2009 to 2015: Gilles Boeuf
 2015 to present:

Friends
Membership includes free entry to all galleries of the museum and the botanical garden. The Friends have assisted the museum with many purchases for its collections over the years, as well as funds for scientific and structural development.

Pictures gallery 

Gallery captions :
A) The cetaceum (podium of cetaceans), in the Comparative Anatomy gallery
B) Statue of Bernardin de Saint-Pierre, with Paul and Virginia
C) The alpine garden
D) The Hôtel de Magny
E) The gallery of Paleontology and Comparative Anatomy, with the statue of the First Artist by Paul Richer
F) The Gallery of Mineralogy and Geology
G) The greenhouse of New Caledonia built between 1834 and 1836 (at the time the "oriental pavilion") according to the plans of Charles Rohault de Fleury
H) Cuvier's house on the left and the triangular pediment of the east wing of the Whale Pavilion on the right
I) The Becquerel alley, north side, leads to Cuvier's house where Henri Becquerel discovered radioactivity in 1896
J) The Paleontology gallery, on the second floor, with its mezzanine. The second floor exhibits the vertebrate fossils and the mezzanine the invertebrate fossils
K) One of the zoological shelters of the menagerie
L The façade of the Musée de l'Homme, in the southwest wing of the Palais de Chaillot
M The botanical museum of La Jaÿsinia, in the Alps
N The excavations of the Pataud shelter, in Dordogne.

See also
 List of museums in Paris

Notes and citations

Bibliography (in French)

External links

 MNHN official website (English version)
 the Virtual Gallery of Mineralogy (English version)
 Flickr Mostly Paris, some Lille.
 Photos of Muséum national d'histoire naturelle (English version)

1793 establishments in France
Natural history
Natural history museums in France
Natural history
Grands établissements
5th arrondissement of Paris
France
Museums established in 1793